The following is a list of Lima's mayors through the 20th and 21st centuries.

Alcaldes ordinarios of the first and the second vote

Mayors of Lima

See also

 Timeline of Lima

Lima
 
Mayors